is a studio album by Japanese singer/songwriter Yōko Oginome in collaboration with the Fuji TV children's variety show . Released through Victor Entertainment on July 21, 1993, it was Oginome's first self-produced album and features the voices of Hidetō Tajima as Ugo Ugo-kun, Yuka Koide as Lhuga-chan, Ikuko Sakurai as Terebi-kun, and Oginome as Planet-chan. The album was reissued on May 26, 2010 with ten bonus tracks as part of Oginome's 25th anniversary celebration.

The album peaked at No. 35 on Oricon's albums chart and sold over 19,000 copies.

Track listing

Charts

References

External links
 
 
 

1993 albums
Yōko Oginome albums
Japanese-language albums
Victor Entertainment albums